Feiselberg is a mountain of Gladenbach Uplands near Caldern, Landkreis Marburg-Biedenkopf, Hesse, Germany.

References 

Mountains of Hesse